The Martin County Courthouse in Inez in Martin County, Kentucky was listed on the National Register of Historic Places in 2006.

It is the fourth courthouse built in Inez;  it was built during 1938–41.

References

Courthouses on the National Register of Historic Places in Kentucky
Late 19th and Early 20th Century American Movements architecture
Government buildings completed in 1941
National Register of Historic Places in Martin County, Kentucky
County courthouses in Kentucky
1941 establishments in Kentucky